Beyza Kocatürk (born 9 December 1996) is a Turkish women's football defender currently playing in the Women's Super League for ALG Spor with jersey number 3. She played for the national girls' U-17 and the women's U-19 teams, before she became a member of the Turkey women's team.

Club career 
Beyza Kocatürk received her license for her hometown club İzmit Saratbajçe Belediyespor on 10 June 2008. After one season, she transferred to İzmit Belediyespor, where she played three seasons from 2009 to 2012.  She was later with İzmit Çenesuyu Plajyoluspor,  Karşıyaka Koleji Spor and Kireçburnu Spor for one season. In the 2015–16 season, Kocatürk joined Trabzon İdmanocağı to play in the First League again after three seasons. After two seasons with Trabzon İdmanocağı, she returned for the first half of the 2017–18 season to her former club Kireçburnu Spor in the 2017–18 league season. For the second half of that season, Kocatürk joined Trabzon İdmanocağı again.

In the 2018–19 league season, she transferred to Ataşehir Belediyespor.

By October 2019, she signed with Fatih Vatan Spor. Her team finished the 2020–21 Women's First League season as runner-up after losing to Beşiktaş J.K. in the final.

In the 2021–22 Women'per League season, she transferred to ALG Spor. She enjoyed her team's league champion title.
On 18 August 2022, she debuted in the 2022–23 UEFA Women's Champions League.

International career 
Kocatürk debuted for the Turkey girls' U-17 team at the 2012 UEFA Women's Under-17 Championship qualification round match against Serbia. She took part at the 2012 UEFA Women's Under-17 Development Cup match against Azerbaijan.

She played for the national women's U-19 team at the 2015 UEFA Women's Under-19 Championship qualification round match against Kazakhstan. She took part at the 2015 UEFA Women's Under-19 Championship qualification match against Italy.

Career statistics 
.

Honours 
 Turkish Women's First League
 Fatih Vatan Spor
 Runners-up (1): 2020–21
 ALG Spor
 Champions (1): 2021-22

 Turkish Women's Second League
 İzmit Belediyespor
 Winners (1): 2011–12

References 

Living people
1996 births
People from İzmit
Turkish women's footballers
Women's association football defenders
Kireçburnu Spor players
Trabzon İdmanocağı women's players
Ataşehir Belediyespor players
Fatih Vatan Spor players
ALG Spor players
Turkish Women's Football Super League players